Wolverine Peak is a mountain in the Absaroka Range in the state of Montana, United States. The summit of Wolverine Peak is located at the triple border point between the Absaroka-Beartooth Wilderness, Custer National Forest and Yellowstone National Park.

References

Mountains of Montana
Mountains of Park County, Montana